Gy-les-Nonains is a commune in the Loiret department in north-central France.

Geography
The commune is traversed by the river Ouanne.

See also
 Communes of the Loiret department

References

Gylesnonains